Black to the Blind is the third album by the Polish death metal band Vader. It was released on 13 October 1997 in Europe and Poland by System Shock/Impact Records and Koch International Poland, respectively. Japanese edition with one bonus track was released by Avalon/Marquee. The album was nominated for a Fryderyk Award in the category 'Hard & Heavy Album of the Year (Album roku - hard & heavy)'.

Black to the Blind was recorded between July and August 1997 at Selani Studio in Olsztyn, Poland, and was produced by Piotr "Peter" Wiwczarek and Andrzej Bomba. The album was mastered by Julita Emanuiłow. The album features cover art by Jacek Wiśniewski. Song "Carnal" from the album was used in Polish action movie Gniew (Anger) from 1998, directed by Marcin Ziębiński. It was also released by Koch International as part of soundtrack for this movie.
 
In 2012 Witching Hour Productions released remastered edition of Black to the Blind with new cover art, and layout by Zbigniew Bielak. Remastering was made by Wiesławscy Brothers, and it took place at Hertz Studio, Białystok in Poland.

Track listing

Personnel
Production and performance credits are adapted from the album liner notes.

Carnal / Black to the Blind
Carnal / Black to the Blind is the second single by the Polish death metal band Vader. It was released only in Poland in 1997 with special edition of Thrash'em All magazine entitled Super Poster" #1. Apart from promo single insert includes interview with Piotr "Peter" Wiwczarek, Polish translation of lyrics from Black to the Blind, and additional information about the band.

Track listing

Release history

References 

Vader (band) albums
1997 albums